L80, l-80, or, variation, may refer to:

 Roy Williams Airport (FAA LID: L80), in Joshua Tree, California, U.S.
 HMIS Hindustan (L80), a ship
 Volkswagen L80, a truck
 Valmet L-80 Turbo-Vinha, a Finnish military trainer aircraft
 LG L80 Dual, a smartphone running Optimus UI

See also

 
 
 L (disambiguation)
 80 (disambiguation)
 I80 (disambiguation) (i-eight-zero; I80)
 180 (disambiguation) (one-eight-zero; 180)
 18O (disambiguation) (one-eight-o; 18o)